Two ships of the United States Navy have been named Invincible.

Invincible